South End Grounds refers to any one of three baseball parks on one site in Boston, Massachusetts. They were home to the franchise that eventually became known as the Boston Braves, first in the National Association and later in the National League, from 1871 to 1914.

At least in its third edition, the formal name of the park—as indicated by the sign over its entrance gate—was Boston National League Base Ball Park. It was located on the northeast corner of Columbus Avenue and Walpole Street (now Saint Cyprian's Place), just southwest of Carter Playground. Accordingly, it was also known over the years as Walpole Street Grounds; two other names were Union Base-ball Grounds and Boston Baseball Grounds.

The ballpark was across the New York, New Haven and Hartford Railroad tracks, to the south, from the eventual site of the Huntington Avenue Grounds, home field of Boston's American League team prior to the building of Fenway Park.

The Boston club was initially known as the "Red Stockings," because four of its key players had come from the famous 1869–1870 barnstorming team known as the Cincinnati Red Stockings and took the nickname with them to Boston. Over time the team acquired other informal nicknames, such as "Beaneaters," "Red Caps," "Rustlers" and "Doves." This team eventually adopted the official nickname "Braves," just a few years before abandoning South End Grounds.

With its tight foul lines and expansive center field, like a scaled-down version of the Polo Grounds, it was sometimes said that the South End had no right or left field, only a center field.

South End Grounds was rebuilt twice during its lifetime, the first time by choice and the second time by necessity.

First park
The first game at the South End Grounds was played on May 16, 1871. The original stands were small and rectangular, not unlike the seating area at a county fair grounds. Behind the right field area were residences and other buildings, and a narrow road called Berlin Street. Columbus Avenue had not yet been extended as far as the ball park.

The Red Stockings dominated the National Association, finishing just two games behind the leaders in 1871, then winning four straight pennants to close out the NA. They joined the newly formed National League in 1876 and won three championships over the first 12 NL seasons. The last game at this version of the grounds came on September 10, 1887. The ballpark's stands were demolished later that month to make way for a new structure.

Second park
The second South End Grounds was opened on May 25, 1888. Sometimes referred to as the "Grand Pavilion," it consisted of a large double-decker grandstand behind home plate and uncovered stands stretching down the right and left field lines, as well as bleachers in right-center field. The medieval-style "witch's cap" turrets were a very popular decoration on public seating structures of the 1880s and 1890s. The ballpark seated 6,800 by one estimate. It was the only double-decked baseball stadium ever built in Boston, apart from the rooftop seating which has turned the single-decked Fenway Park into a de facto double-deck ballpark. The stadium was destroyed in the Great Roxbury Fire of May 16, 1894, which began when children started a small fire beneath the right field bleachers, and which spread and destroyed the stadium and 117 other buildings. During the rebuilding process, the Bostons played their home games at Congress Street Grounds.

Third park

The third South End Grounds was built in 10 weeks on the site of the old stand and opened on July 20, 1894. Because the previous structure had not been sufficiently insured, there wasn't enough money to rebuild the stands according to its old plans, and a smaller structure was built. One result of the fire was a reconfiguration of the buildings and streets in the area. Berlin Street disappeared, and Columbus Avenue was constructed, running just outside the right field area, replacing wooden buildings that had once stood there.

Few photographs of this ballpark seem to be in circulation. In one sense, the best known photo might be the one showing the opening game of the 1903 World Series, with the Huntington Avenue Grounds in the foreground; and the South End Grounds in the background, its season over, partially hidden by smoke from the rail yards. That image can be seen beside this text. On September 12, 1911, 44-year-old legend Cy Young pitched the final home game of his career in a Boston uniform at the grounds against the New York Giants and fellow future Baseball Hall of Famer Christy Mathewson. The Braves, as they had been rechristened in 1912, moved out of the South End Grounds after their game on August 11, 1914, to accommodate larger crowds during the "stretch drive" of the 1914 pennant race. The team continued to play at Fenway Park until Braves Field was completed during the 1915 season. In contrast to the 11-year lifespan of the Huntington Avenue Grounds, the South End Grounds was the National Association / National League club's home for parts of 44 seasons, a longer time span than any subsequent Braves' home fields.

Current use
The stadium was demolished after the Braves left. The former site of the grandstand and the infield is located where Northeastern University's Interdisciplinary Science and Engineering Complex (ISEC) currently stands, between the Columbus Parking Garage and Ruggles Station of the Orange Line of the Massachusetts Bay Transportation Authority. The outfield was located where the garage stands.  A historical marker commemorating the South End Grounds is located at Ruggles Station.

References

Sources
Green Cathedrals, by Phil Lowry
Ballparks of North America, by Michael Benson
Baseball Memories 1900–1909, by Marc OkkonenBaseball Uniforms of the 20th Century'', by Marc Okkonen

External links

South End Grounds at Ballparks.com
Boston Sports Temples, exhibition, Boston Public Library, November 17, 2012 – May 31, 2013
South End Grounds at Project Ballpark
A map from about 1900, showing the ballpark
Sanborn map showing the ballpark, 1887 - and streets prior to the 1894 fire
Sanborn map showing the ballpark, 1897
Sanborn map showing the ballpark, 1914
Boston birdseye map, 1879 - South End Grounds near left edge
Boston birdseye map, 1888 - South End Grounds toward lower right

1871 establishments in Massachusetts
1914 disestablishments in Massachusetts
Baseball venues in Boston
Defunct baseball venues in Massachusetts
Defunct sports venues in Boston
Boston Braves stadiums
Boston College Eagles football venues
Harvard Crimson football venues
Defunct Major League Baseball venues
Demolished sports venues in Massachusetts